Samuel Peter W. Riley (born 8 January 1980) is an English actor and singer. He is best known for his performance in the 2007 biographical film Control about the life of Ian Curtis, as protagonist Sal Paradise in the 2012 adaptation of the Jack Kerouac novel On the Road, and as Diaval in the 2014 film Maleficent. Riley received renown for his portrayal of the Fitzwilliam Darcy in the 2016 film Pride and Prejudice and Zombies.

Early life
Riley was born in Menston, Bradford, West Yorkshire, the son of Amanda, a nursery school teacher, and Andrew Riley, a textile agent. He was educated at Malsis School, Cross Hills, and at Uppingham School.

Career

Acting
His breakthrough performance came when he played the role of Ian Curtis in the film Control, a biopic about the lead singer of the 1970s post-punk band Joy Division. The film received high critical acclaim due in good part to Riley's performance, which won him a selection of awards including the British Independent Film Award for "Most Promising Newcomer" a BAFTA "Rising Star" nomination; and a Mark Kermode nod for Best Actor 2007.

Prior to his portrayal of Ian Curtis, Riley played the Fall frontman Mark E. Smith in the Michael Winterbottom film 24 Hour Party People, which details the Factory Records era and featured Sean Harris as Ian Curtis. Riley's scenes, however, were omitted from the final cut.

In September 2007, Riley was cast in Gerald McMorrow's British science fiction film Franklyn. He starred as the lead role in 13, an English language remake of the French thriller 13 Tzameti that has yet to have an American and European release. He played the role of Pinkie Brown in Brighton Rock alongside Helen Mirren, an adaption of Graham Greene's novel, released 4 February 2011. He also starred in Walter Salles' film adaptation of Jack Kerouac's autobiographical On the Road playing the narrator and protagonist Sal Paradise. He also has a small role in the 2011 German comedy , in which his wife Alexandra Maria Lara plays the female lead. His role is listed as "Wagenmeister".

In Byzantium (2012), a film directed by Neil Jordan, he appears alongside Gemma Arterton and Saoirse Ronan as Darvell.

In 2012, Riley was cast as Diaval in Disney's Maleficent, alongside Angelina Jolie. The film was released May 2014.

In 2015, he played Benoit  Labarie in Saul Dibb's film adaptation of Irène Némirovsky's novel Suite Française, opposite Michelle Williams, Matthias Schoenaerts,
Kristin Scott Thomas and Ruth Wilson.

Riley was also cast as Fitzwilliam Darcy (Mr. Darcy) in the film, Pride and Prejudice and Zombies, released in February 2016.

Riley played the 'not-so welcome' returning prodigal brother David in the 2018 film Happy New Year, Colin Burstead by Ben Wheatley.

Modelling
He featured in the autumn/winter 2008 publicity campaign for the British fashion house Burberry,  supervised by Christopher Bailey and shot by Mario Testino. He modelled the fall/winter 2014 Stefano Pilati-designed couture collection of Ermenegildo Zegna. He was named one of GQs 50 best dressed British men in 2015.

Music
For a few years Riley was the lead singer of the Leeds band 10,000 Things, with whom he achieved moderate success. After their first release on indie label Voltage Records in 2002, they signed to major label Polydor for one self-titled album. They disbanded in 2005.

Personal life
As of 2011, Riley lives in Berlin with his wife, Romanian-German actress Alexandra Maria Lara. They met while filming Control, married in August 2009 and have a son born in January 2014.

Filmography

References

External links

Sam Riley at the British Film Institute

1980 births
Living people
English expatriates in Germany
English male film actors
English male singers
English male television actors
Male actors from Bradford
National Youth Theatre members
People educated at Uppingham School
People from Menston
21st-century English male actors
21st-century English singers
21st-century British male singers